Football Club Krumovgrad is a football club based in Krumovgrad, Bulgaria. which currently competes in the Second League, the second level of Bulgarian football league system. They plays its home matches at the local Krumovgrad Stadium.

History

Establishment and regional leagues
Original club was founded as Levski Krumovgrad in 1925, the team mostly played in the regional leagues. For a short period the team does not exist, but in 2005, the team was refounded under the name Levski 2005.

FC Krumovgrad and professional leagues (2021-present)
In 2021 the team won a promotion to the Bulgarian Third League and set a serious ambitions to win the group and be promoted to the professional football with Stefan Genov becoming a manager. On 21 September 2021 they eliminated the First League team of Tsarsko Selo. In October 2021, the club changed its name from Levski 2005 to Krumovgrad and adopted a new badge. In February 2022 Krumovgrad signed with Daniel Cerejido, the chief executive officer of Botev Plovdiv. On 14 March 2022 the club won South-East Third League and was promoted to the Second League for the first time in their history.

Honours
South-East Third League
 : Winners (1): 2021–22
Bulgarian Cup:
 Round of 16 (1): 2021–22

Colours and badge
Krumovgrad plays in blue and yellow colours.

Squad

For recent transfers, see Transfers summer 2022.

Out on loan

Foreign players 
Up to five non-EU nationals can be registered and given a squad number for the first team in the Bulgarian First Professional League however only three can be used in a match day. Those non-EU nationals with European ancestry can claim citizenship from the nation their ancestors came from. If a player does not have European ancestry he can claim Bulgarian citizenship after playing in Bulgaria for 5 years. 

EU Nationals
 Hugo Azzi
 Verrone
 Daniel Miljanović

EU Nationals (Dual citizenship)

Non-EU Nationals
 Jefferson Granado
  Alexandru Osipov

Past seasons

Personal

Club officials

Manager history

Manager history

References

External links
 Official website
 Profile at bgclubs.eu

Football clubs in Bulgaria
Association football clubs established in 1925
1925 establishments in Bulgaria